The Crioceratidae constitute a family of loosely to closely coiled  Ammonitida included in the Ancyloceratoidea that lived during the Early Cretaceous; characterized by Crioceratites and other genera such as Hoplocrioceras and Paracrioceras.

The Crioceratidae are gyroconic, coiled in a plane, generally with space between the whorls although in some like Balearites the whorls are barely in contact.

Although distinct in character and not truly heteromorphic the Crioceratidae were included in the American TreatisePart L, 1957, in the Ancyloceratidae as the subfamily Crioceratinae. It is now considered a distinct family as originally proposed by Wright 1952 with the Acrioceratidae, proposed by Vermeulen (2004), a transition between the two.

Other genera in the Crioceratidae include Aegocrioceras, Menutheocrioceras, and Shasticrioceras.

References
 W.J. Arkell, et al., 1957. Mesozoic Ammonoidea; Treatise on Invertebrate Paleontology, Part L, Mollusca 4. Geological Society of America and University of Kansas Press.

Cretaceous ammonites